Hypostomus coppenamensis is a species of catfish in the family Loricariidae. It is native to South America, where it occurs in the upper Coppename River basin in Suriname, for which it is named. The species reaches 12.5 cm (4.9 inches) in standard length and is believed to be a facultative air-breather.

Hypostomus coppenamensis sometimes appears in the aquarium trade, where it is typically known as the blackspotted Suriname pleco.

References 

coppenamensis
Taxa named by Marinus Boeseman
Fish described in 1969